Splenic sequestration crisis (SSC) is a life-threatening illness common in pediatric patients with homozygous sickle cell disease and beta thalassemia. Up to 30% of these children may develop SSC with a mortality rate of up to 15%. This crisis occurs when splenic vaso-occlusion causes a large percentage of total blood volume to become trapped within the spleen. Clinical signs include severe, rapid drop in hemoglobin leading to hypovolemic shock and death. Pediatric patients with sickle cell disease and beta thalassemia experience multiple splenic infarcts, resulting in splenic fibrosis and scarring. Over time, this leads to a small, auto infarcted spleen typically by the time patients reach adulthood. Splenic sequestration crisis can only occur in functioning spleens which may be why this crisis is rarely seen in adults. However, late adolescent or adult patients in this group who maintain splenic function may develop splenic sequestration crisis.

References

Spleen (anatomy)